Arcestidae is an extinct family of ammonite cephalopods.

Fossils of Arcestidae are found in the Triassic marine strata throughout the world, including Austria, Canada, Georgia, Hungary, Indonesia, Iran, Israel, Mexico, Nepal, New Zealand, Oman, Papua New Guinea, Romania, Russia, Slovenia, Turkey, Ukraine, United States.

Genera and species

 Anisarcestes † Kittl 1908
 Arcestes † Suess 1865
 Arcestes andersoni † Hyatt and Smith 1905
 Arcestes intuslabiatus † Mojsisovics 1873
 Arcestes megaphyllus † Beyrich 1864
 Arcestes priscus † Waagen 1879
 Arcestes syngonus † Mojsisovics 1873
 Stenarcestes † Mojsisovics 1896
 Stenarcestes leiostracus † Mojsisovics 1875

References 

 Arkell et al.  Mesozoic Ammonoidea. Treaatise on Invertebrate Paleontology, Part L, 1957 Geological Society of America and University of Kansas press, R.C.Moore ed. 
 Johnston, F.N. Trias of New Pass Nevada (New lower Karnic ammonoids); Journal of Paleontology V.15 No 5 p 447–491, Sept 1941
  Paleobiology Database

 
Ceratitida families
Middle Triassic first appearances
Late Triassic extinctions